Ronald Blanco La Cruz is a Venezuelan politician.

Biography
Ronald Blanco La Cruz was born in Caracas on April 12, 1959 to José Vicente Blanco and Ana Julia La Cruz.  He spent his early years going to school in his birth city.  In 1977 he received his Bachelor of Science degree.  He later joined the Military Academy of Venezuela (Academia Militar de Venezuela) where he received a licence in Military Arts & Sciences in 1981.  That same year, he was deployed to the Cuartel Bolívar del Táchira, a military base.  Blanco is currently a retired captain of the Venezuelan Army and has a Master's degree in international relations and Company Management, obtaining both titles from Troy University in the United States.  He has held various positions in the Táchira State, among them the director of the Maternal-Infantile Nourishing Program (Programa Alimentario Maternal Infantil, also known as PAMI).  He was also a professor at the Universidad de los Andes.  In 1999, he was elected to the National Constituent Assembly, where he served as the President of the Subcommission of Borders.  From 2000 to 2008, Blanco La Cruz was governor of Táchira State.

Personal life

Ronald Blanco is married and they have three children named Royma, Ronald, and Indira.

References

1959 births
Living people
Governors of Táchira
People from Caracas
Venezuelan soldiers
United Socialist Party of Venezuela politicians
People of the 1992 Venezuelan coup d'état attempts
Recipients of Venezuelan presidential pardons
Members of the Venezuelan Constituent Assembly of 1999